Ground may refer to:

Geology
 Land, the solid terrestrial surface of the Earth
 Soil, a mixture of clay, sand and organic matter present on the surface of the Earth

Electricity
 Ground (electricity), the reference point in an electrical circuit from which voltages are measured
 Earthing system, part of an electrical installation that connects with the Earth's conductive surface
 Ground and neutral, closely related terms

Law
 Ground (often grounds), in law, a rational motive or basis for a belief, conviction, or action taken, such as a legal action or argument:
 Grounds for divorce, regulations specifying the circumstances under which a person will be granted a divorce

Music
 Ground (album), the second album by the Nels Cline Trio
 "Ground" (song), one of the songs in the debut album of the Filipino rock band Rivermaya
 Ground bass, in music, a bass part that continually repeats, while the melody and harmony over it change
 The Ground, a 2005 album by Norwegian jazz pianist Tord Gustavsen

Other
 Ground (art), a base for the paint layers of a picture.
 Coffee grounds, ground up coffee beans
 Ground tissue, one of the three types of tissue systems in a plant
 Ground term, in symbolic logic, a term with no variables
 Ground (unit), a unit of area used in India
 Ground (Dzogchen),  the primordial state in Dzogchen
 Ground surface, often on metals, created by various grinding operations
 Ground (cricket), where cricket games are played, and also part of the playing area.

See also

 
 
 Grounding (disambiguation)
 Grounded (disambiguation)
 Grounds (disambiguation)
 Earth (disambiguation)
 Grind (disambiguation), 
 Ground level (disambiguation)
Ground of Being (disambiguation)